La Esmeralda Dam is an embankment dam on the Batá River northwest of Santa María in Boyacá Department, Neira Province, Valle de Tenza (Tenza Valley) Colombia, 52 km to south of Tunja city. The primary purpose of the dam is hydroelectric power production and it is part of the Chivor Hydroelectric Project. Water from the Batá is diverted by the dam to a power station that discharges to the Lengupá River. The power station supplies 8% of Colombia's power demand.

History
Initial studies for the project began in 1954. The idea behind the dam was to divert water from the Batá to the Lengupá which lies at a much lower elevation. This idea was originally suggested by a topographer at The Electric Promotion Institute and later contemplated by an American-French delegation that was helping to develop Colombia's Electrification Plan at the time. Colombia's president at the time, Gustavo Rojas Pinilla promoted the project as well and it was dubbed "Project Gustavo". In 1958, further studies including geological and hydrological began. The hydroelectric project was designed in two 500 MW stages and it became apparent that additional funding would be needed to construct it. In November 1970, Ingetec S.A — under the supervision of Interconexión Electrica S.A — began construction on stage one after receiving a World Bank loan. Stage one was complete in 1977 and a year prior, construction on stage two had started in June. By 1982, stage two was completed and inaugurated. Stage two required a World Bank loan as well. In 1996, operation and ownership of the dam and power plant was transferred from the public to the private sector.

Dam
Helping to withhold the reservoir are two auxiliary dams.

Chivor Power Station
Near the banks of the Lengupá River, the tunnels split into eight separate penstocks to supply each  Pelton turbine-generator with water. Once utilised for electricity, the water is discharged into the Lengupá.

See also

List of power stations in Colombia
List of conventional hydroelectric power stations

References

External links
AES Chivor Homepage

Dams completed in 1976
Dams in Colombia
Rock-filled dams
Buildings and structures in Boyacá Department